Colette Crabbé is a Belgian swimmer, born in Liège.

She competed at the 1976 Summer Olympics where she competed in the 200 metre breaststroke.

She is mother of triathlete Claire Michel.

She was also a Belgian national champion.

References

Belgian female breaststroke swimmers
1959 births
Living people
Sportspeople from Liège
Olympic swimmers of Belgium
Swimmers at the 1976 Summer Olympics
Female breaststroke swimmers